Grêmio Esportivo Inhumense, commonly known as Grêmio Inhumense, was a Brazilian football club based in Inhumas, Goiás state. It competed once in the Série C.

History
The club was founded on March 15, 1999. It competed in the Série C in 2005, when it was eliminated in the First Stage of the competition. After the club moved to Anápolis, it was renamed Grêmio Esportivo Anápolis.

Stadium

Grêmio Esportivo Inhumense played its home games at Estádio Jonas Duarte in Anápolis. The stadium has a maximum capacity of 17,800 people.

References

Association football clubs established in 1999
Defunct football clubs in Goiás
1999 establishments in Brazil